Delamarephorura is a genus of springtails within the family Tullbergiidae. There are currently 5 species assigned to the genus.

Species 

 Delamarephorura bedosae 
 Delamarephorura capensis 
 Delamarephorura salti 
 Delamarephorura szeptickii 
 Delamarephorura tami

References 

Springtail genera
Poduromorpha